Alexander Vencel (born 2 March 1967) is a Slovak former professional footballer who played as a goalkeeper. He works as goalkeeping coach and assistant manager of Jordan.

Career
Born in Bratislava, Vencel debuted professionally with Slovan Bratislava in the 1988–89 season.

He signed for French team RC Strasbourg Alsace in 1994, and helped them win the 1995 UEFA Intertoto Cup and the Coupe de la Ligue in 1997. In the 1999–2000 season he saw limited playing time and went to Le Havre AC in Ligue 2. He helped them win promotion in 2002, but they were relegated the following season.

Vencel got 19 caps for the Slovak national team between 1994 and 1998, plus 2 caps for Czechoslovakia from 1991 to 1992. He is the son of Alexander Vencel senior, who played for the Czechoslovak national team in the 1970 FIFA World Cup.

Career statistics

Club

International

References

External links

1967 births
Living people
Slovak footballers
Footballers from Bratislava
Czechoslovak footballers
Association football goalkeepers
Slovakia international footballers
Czechoslovakia international footballers
Dual internationalists (football)
ŠK Slovan Bratislava players
FK Hvězda Cheb players
RC Strasbourg Alsace players
Le Havre AC players
Ligue 1 players
Ligue 2 players
Slovak expatriate footballers
Slovak expatriate sportspeople in France
Expatriate footballers in France